Ilgar Abdurahmanov (born 27 March 1979) is an Azerbaijani former professional football player.

External links
 
 
 

1979 births
Footballers from Baku
Living people
Association football midfielders
Azerbaijani footballers
Azerbaijan international footballers
Azerbaijani expatriate footballers
Expatriate footballers in Russia
Expatriate footballers in Belarus
Expatriate footballers in Kazakhstan
FC KAMAZ Naberezhnye Chelny players
FC Anzhi Makhachkala players
FC Belshina Bobruisk players
Khazar Lankaran FK players
Simurq PIK players
FC Baku players
FK Mughan players
FC Energiya Volzhsky players
Russian Premier League players
FC Zhenis Astana players
FK MKT Araz players
FC Chernomorets Novorossiysk players